The Starlost is a Canadian-produced science fiction television series created by writer Harlan Ellison and broadcast in 1973 on CTV in Canada and syndicated to local stations in the United States. The show's setting is a huge generational colony spacecraft called Earthship Ark, which has gone off course. Many of the descendants of the original crew and colonists are unaware, however, that they are aboard a ship. The series experienced a number of production difficulties, and Ellison broke with the project before the airing of its first episode.

Premise 
The ship contains dozens of biospheres, each kilometres across and housing people of different cultures; their goal is to find and seed a new world of a distant star. In 2385, more than 100 years into the voyage, an unexplained accident occurs, and the ship goes into emergency mode, whereby each biosphere is sealed off from the others.

In 2790, 405 years after the accident, Devon (Keir Dullea) a resident of Cypress Corners, an agrarian community with a culture resembling that of the Amish, discovers that his world is far larger and more mysterious than he had realized. Considered an outcast because of his questioning of the way things are, especially his refusal to accept the arranged marriage of his love Rachel (Gay Rowan) to his friend Garth (Robin Ward),  Devon finds out that the Cypress Corners elders have been deliberately manipulating the local computer terminal, which they call "The Voice of The Creator". The congregation pursues Devon for attacking the elders and stealing a computer cassette on which they have recorded their orders, and its leaders plot to execute him, but the elderly Abraham, who also questions the elders, gives Devon a key to a dark, mysterious doorway, which Abraham himself is afraid to enter.  The frightened Devon escapes into the service areas of the ship and accesses a computer data station that explains the nature and purpose of the Ark and hints at its problems.

When Devon returns to Cypress Corners to tell his community what he has learned, he is put on trial for heresy and condemned to death by stoning.  Escaping on the night before his execution with the aid of Garth, Devon convinces Rachel to come with him, and Garth pursues them. When Rachel refuses to return with Garth, he joins her and Devon. Eventually they make their way to the ship's bridge, containing the skeletal remains of its crew.  It is badly damaged and its control systems are inoperative.  The three discover that the Ark is on a collision course with a Class G star similar to the Sun, and realize that the only way to save the Ark and its passengers is to find the backup bridge at the other end of the Ark, and reactivate the navigation and propulsion systems.

Getting to the other end of the Ark, which is potentially hundreds of miles away, involves traveling through the many disparate communities on the starship—some of which are hostile to outsiders, and all of which have different social customs, belief systems and law enforcement practices.   Generally, each episode will have Devon, Rachel and Garth encountering a new society or group as they work their way through the ship.  Occasionally, they are aided (or hindered) in their travels by the ship's frustrating and only partially functioning computer system interface, known as Mu Lambda 165 (portrayed by William Osler, who also provided the opening narration for each episode).

20th Century Fox was involved in the project with Douglas Trumbull as executive producer. Science fiction writer and editor Ben Bova was brought in as science advisor.

Development and production 
Harlan Ellison was approached by Robert Kline, a 20th Century Fox television producer, to come up with an idea for a science fiction TV series consisting of eight episodes, to pitch to the BBC as a co-production in February 1973. The BBC rejected the idea. Unable to sell The Starlost for prime time, Kline decided to pursue a low budget approach and produce it for syndication. By May, Kline had sold the idea to 48 NBC stations and the Canadian CTV network.

Ellison claimed that to get Canadian government subsidies, the production was shot in Canada and Canadian writers produced the scripts from story outlines by Ellison.  However, several produced episodes were written entirely by American writers.

Before Ellison could begin work on the show's production bible, a writers' strike began, running from March 6 to June 24. Kline negotiated an exception with the Writer's Guild, on the grounds that the production was wholly Canadian — and Ellison went to work on a bible for the series.

Originally, the show was to be filmed with a special effects camera system developed by Doug Trumbull called Magicam. The system comprised two cameras, the motion of which was controlled by servos. One camera would film actors against a blue screen, while the other would shoot a model background. The motion of both cameras was synchronized and scaled appropriately, allowing both the camera and the actors to move through model sets. The technology did not work reliably. In the end, simple blue screen effects were used, forcing static camera shots.

The failure of the Magicam system was a major blow — as the Canadian studio space that had been rented was too small to build the required sets. In the end, partial sets were built, but the lack of space hampered production.

As the filming went on, Ellison grew disenchanted with the budget cuts, details that were changed, and what he characterized as a progressive dumbing down of the story. Ellison's dissatisfaction extended to the new title of the pilot episode; he had titled it "Phoenix without Ashes" but it was changed to "Voyage of Discovery".

Before the production of the pilot episode was completed, Ellison invoked a clause in his contract to force the producers to use his alternative registered writer's name of "Cordwainer Bird" on the end credits.

Sixteen episodes were made. Fox decided not to pick up the options for the remainder of the series.

Reception and impact

On March 31, 1974, Ellison received a Writers Guild of America Award for Best Original Screenplay for the original script (the pilot script as originally written, not the version that was filmed). A novelization of this script by Edward Bryant, Phoenix Without Ashes, was published in 1975; this contained a lengthy foreword by Ellison describing what had gone on in production. In 2010, the novel was adapted into comic book form by IDW Publishing.

Ben Bova, in an editorial in Analog Science Fiction (June 1974) and in interviews in fanzines, made it clear how disgruntled he had been as science adviser. In 1975, he published a novel entitled The Starcrossed, depicting a scientist taken on as a science adviser for a terrible science fiction series.

The Starlost has generally received a negative reception from historians of science fiction television: The Encyclopedia of Science Fiction described The Starlost as "dire", while The Best of Science Fiction TV included The Starlost in its list of the "Worst Science Fiction Shows of All Time".

Episodes 

The Starlog Photo Guidebook TV Episode Guides Volume 1 (1981) lists two unfilmed episodes, "God That Died" and "People in the Dark." The latter episode, written by George Salverson, follows Devon, Rachel, and Garth as they discover a dome in which people have been living in the dark since the accident to the Ark.

Episodes of the original series were rebroadcast in 1978 and further in 1982. A number of episodes were also edited together to create movie-length installments that were sold to cable television broadcasters in the late 1980s.

Commercial releases 
All 16 episodes were at one time available in a VHS boxed set.

The first DVD release was limited to the five feature-length edited versions.

In September/October 2008, the full series was released on DVD by VCI Entertainment. Aside from the digitally remastered episodes, a "presentation reel" created for potential broadcasters is also included. Hosted by Dullea and Trumbull, and predating Ellison's departure as he is credited under his own name with creating the series, the short feature includes sample footage using the later-abandoned Magicam technology, some filmed special effects footage taken from other productions along with model footage from the film Silent Running to represent the Earthship Ark concept, and a different series logo.

In early 2019, a Roku channel began airing The Starlost as its only program.

Cast 
Keir Dullea as Devon 
Gay Rowan  as Rachel 
Robin Ward as Garth
William Osler as the voice and image of Mu Lambda 165 (a.k.a. Host Computer)

Notable guest stars
Sterling Hayden as Jeremiah   
Frank Converse as Dr. Gerald W. Aaron 
John Colicos as Governor 
Barry Morse as Shaliff  
Lloyd Bochner as Colonel M. P. Garroway  
Diana Barrington  as Captain Janice   
Simon Oakland as Dr. Asgard  
Percy Rodriguez as I. A. Richards  
Angel Tompkins  as Daphne 
Ed Ames as President Mr. Smith  
Alexandra Bastedo  as  Egreck 419B2 Idona 
Walter Koenig as Oro of planet Xar
Antoinette Bower as Dr. Heather Marshall

References

External links 
 
 
 
 

1973 Canadian television series debuts
1974 Canadian television series endings
1970s Canadian science fiction television series
1970s Canadian drama television series
CTV Television Network original programming
English-language television shows
Generation ships in fiction
Space adventure television series
Television series by 20th Century Fox Television
Television series by Glen-Warren Productions
Television series by Bell Media
Fiction set in the 28th century